Phenylobacterium terrae is a Gram negative, aerobic, non-spore-forming, rod-shaped and motile  bacterium from the genus of Phenylobacterium which has been isolated from soil from Khyber Pakhtun Khwa in Pakistan.

References

Caulobacterales
Bacteria described in 2019